Prospect K. Robbins (1788–1847) was a young man well known for his education, military service, and surveying skill in St. Charles and Lincoln counties, Missouri. He is best noted as the man who establish the Fifth Principal Meridian, a foundational survey in the Midwest that established essentially the division of the Louisiana Territory into Missouri Territory and later to the State of Missouri on August 10, 1821.

References

External links
Big Muddy Magazine, Vol. 7.2
Foundation for Restoration of Ste. Genevieve, Inc. Guibourd Historic House & Mecker Research Library
Ste. Genevieve County Historical and Genealogical Resources

People from Pittsfield, Massachusetts
United States Army officers
American surveyors
1788 births
1847 deaths
People from Ste. Genevieve, Missouri
Military personnel from Massachusetts